Estiar or Astiar or Asteyar, also rendered as Istiar, may refer to:
 Estiar, Heris
 Estiar, Tabriz